United Press of India was one of the important news agencies during British Raj in India. It was established in 1933 by Bidhu Bhusan Sengupta, who was also the first managing director of the agency.

History
After resigning from Free Press of India, Sengupta started United Press of India with Dr. Bidhan Chandra Roy as the chairman of the Board of Directors of the agency. Due to financial constraints, the agency collapsed in 1958.

See also
United News of India
Samachar
Press Trust of India
Samachar Bharati
Hindustan Samachar

References

Bibliography

News agencies based in India
Mass media companies of India
Mass media companies established in 1933
1933 establishments in India
1958 disestablishments in India
Mass media companies disestablished in 1958